The School District of Lancaster is a large, urban school district of 11,300 students educated in 19 schools in central Lancaster County, Pennsylvania. Established in 1836, it is the second oldest school district in the state. According to 2000 federal census data, it serves a resident population of 70,348. By 2010, the district's population increased to 74,989 people. The School District of Lancaster serves a racially and economically diverse population of students: 60% Hispanic, 17% African American, 13% Caucasian, 10% Asian/other. 
According to the Pennsylvania Budget and Policy Center, 80.8% of the district's pupils lived at 185% or below the Federal Poverty level as shown by their eligibility for the federal free or reduced price school meal programs in 2012. In 2009, the district residents' per capita income was $16,273 a year, while the median family income was $38,429. In the Commonwealth, the median family income was $49,501  and the United States median family income was $49,445, in 2010. In Lancaster County, the median household income was $54,765. By 2013, the median household income in the United States rose to $52,100.

According to district officials, in school year 2017–2018 the School District of Lancaster provided basic educational services to 11,300 pupils through the employment of 930 teachers, 461 full-time and part-time support personnel, and 160 administrators. The district is a member of Lancaster-Lebanon Intermediate Unit (IU) 13.

The district operates 20 schools in 2017: twelve elementary schools, one K-12 school, four middle schools, one high school campus and two alternative schools. It employs 1,620 staff members, including administrators, teachers, counselors, and support staff.

In 2014, the district sued the state of Pennsylvania, alleging that the state did not provide sufficient funding to provide its students an adequate education.

In 2016, the district was sued by six refugee students who were denied enrollment in the district's high school.
Similar lawsuits had been filed against Utica City School District in New York the prior year, and similar incidents were reported elsewhere in the country.

References

External links 
 Official website

School districts established in 1836
1836 establishments in Pennsylvania
School districts in Lancaster County, Pennsylvania